Minuscule 624 (in the Gregory-Aland numbering), α 191 (von Soden), is a Greek minuscule manuscript of the New Testament, on parchment. Palaeographically it has been assigned to the 11th century. The manuscript is very lacunose. Tischendorf labeled it by 157a and 191p.

Description 

The codex contains the text of the Acts, Catholic epistles, and Pauline epistles on 46 parchment leaves (size ) with numerous lacunae. The text is written in one column per page, 25 lines per page.

 Contents
 Acts 7:33-57; 10:17-40; 18:14-19,9; 20:15-21:1; 23:20-27:34; James 1:1-5:20; 1 Peter 1:1-3:1; 4:4-5:12; 1 John 4:14-5:21; 2 John; 3 John; Jude ; Romans 1:1-4:13; 5:16-16:23; 1 Corinthians 1:1-7:28.

The order of books: Acts, Catholic epistles, and Pauline epistles.

Text 

The Greek text of the codex is a representative of the Byzantine text-type. Aland placed it in Category V.

History 

The manuscript was added to the list of New Testament manuscripts by Johann Martin Augustin Scholz. Gregory saw it in 1886, but he did not examine it thoroughly.

Formerly it was labeled by 157a and 191p. In 1908 Gregory gave the number 624 to it.

The manuscript currently is housed at the Vatican Library (Vat. gr. 1714), at Rome.

See also 

 List of New Testament minuscules
 Biblical manuscript
 Textual criticism

References

Further reading 

 

Greek New Testament minuscules
11th-century biblical manuscripts
Manuscripts of the Vatican Library